The Hochschwab, Hochschwab Mountains, Hochschwab Alps or Hochschwab Group is a mountain range in the Northern Limestone Alps of Austria. The range is in the Styria. The highest peak is also called Hochschwab and is 2,277 metres above the Adriatic.

Location 
The mountain range is located in the eastern part of the Northern Alps in the Austrian state of Styria.

According to the Alpine Club classification of the Eastern Alps (AVE) the range is bounded as follows:
 Großreifling – Salza – Gußwerk – Wegscheid – Seeberg Saddle – Seegraben – Stübmingbach – Thörlbach to its confluence with the Mürz – Mürz to its confluence with the Mur – Mur to Leoben – Vordernberger Bach – Präbichl – Erzbach – Hieflau – Enns to Großreifling

It includes:
 the Hochschwab massif (the Hochschwab group in its specific sense): The extensive limestone plateau covers an area of about 400 km² and is bounded in the east by the Seeberg Saddle and in the west by the Präbichl. Only this massif belongs to the high limestone peaks of the Northern Limestone Alps.
 the Aflenzer Staritzen (may also be viewed as the eastern foothills of the Hochschwab bergstock)
 the Zeller Staritzen, in the far northeast
 Polster, Hochturm, Pribitz and Meßnerin – these are the southern prealps (Vorstöcke) of the  Hochschwab east of Präbichl
 the northern perimeter mountains of the Aflenz Basin, less clearly distinguished from the Hochschwab Group to the north, but with more of a lower mountain character: Ilgner Alpl, Aflenzer Bürgeralm, Oisching/Schießlingalm
 part of the greywacke zone:
 the mountains between Pichl-Großdorf and Etmißl
 the two groups around Kletschachkogel and Thalerkogel between the valleys of Vordernbergertal and Lamingtal 
 the group of the Floning from the Lamingtal valley by the lower Thörlbach stream 

Customarily only the limestone alpine region is described as the Hochschwab Group. The area classified systematically by the Alpine Clubs as the southern parts (along the significant orographic line of the valley), which have a completely different appearance, are known hereabouts as the Mürzsteg Alps or Mürz Hills (Mürzberge).

Alpine huts 

 Voisthaler Hut (ÖAV, 1,654 m) - at the foot of the Edelspitzen
 Sonnschien Hut (ÖAV, 1,523 m)
 Leobner Hut (ÖAV, 1,582 m) - to the southwest of the mountain range, reachable from the Präbichl pass. Currently closed.
  (ÖTK, 2,154 m) - northeast of the Hochschwab peak
 Fölzalm (1,484 m)
 Häuslalm (1,526 m)
 Gsollalm (1,201 m)
 Pfaffingalm (1,550 m)

Significant peaks 

 Hochschwab (2,277 m)
 Ringkamp (2,153 m)
 Ebenstein (2,123 m)
 Trenchtling (Hochturm) (2,081 m)
 Großer Griesstein (2,023 m)
 Beilstein (2,012 m)
 Hohe Weichsel (Aflenzer Staritzen) (2,006 m)
 Brandstein (2,003 m)
 Riegerin (1,939 m)
 Pfaffenstein (1,871 m)
 Meßnerin (1,835 m)
 Hochblaser (1,771 m)
 Thalerkogel (1,655 m)
 Floning (1,583 m)
 Pribitz (1,579 m)
 Kampeck (1,525 m)
 Kletschachkogel (1,457 m)

References

Literature 
 Günter und Luise Auferbauer: Hochschwab. Rother Wanderführer, 
 Liselotte Buchenauer: Hochschwab, 1960 (2nd edn., 1974), Leykam Verlag  
 Rudolf Ägyd Lindner: Hochschwab. H. Weishaupt Verlag 
 Ewald Putz: Hochschwab.

External links 

 Huts of the Hochschwab Group
 Hochschwab Museum, Bodenbauer
 Water Supply Museum, Wildalpen
 Rockfalls in the  Alps (Christof Kuhn)
 

Mountain ranges of the Alps
Northern Limestone Alps
Mountain ranges of Styria